Kopargaon taluka, is a taluka in Shirdi subdivision of Ahmednagar district in Maharashtra State of India.

Area
The table below shows area of the taluka by land type.

Villages
There are around 79 villages in Kopargaon taluka. For a list of villages see Villages in Kopargaon taluka.
There are major villages like Karanji bk, Kolapewadi, Manjur, Chas Nali, Sanwaster, Pohegaon, Dhamori, Dauch Khurd, sangvi bhusar, Rawanda, etc.

Population
The table below shows population of the taluka by sex. The data is as per 2001 census.

Rain Fall
The Table below details of rainfall from year 1981 to 2004.

See also
 Talukas in Ahmednagar district
 Villages in Kopargaon taluka

References

Cities and towns in Ahmednagar district
Talukas in Ahmednagar district
Talukas in Maharashtra

mr:कोपरगाव तालुका